Banda Sinaloense MS de Sergio Lizárraga, also known as Banda MS, is a Mexican Banda from Mazatlán, Sinaloa founded in 2003. The MS stands for Mazatlán, Sinaloa. It was created by brothers Sergio and Alberto Lizárraga, who are also members of the group. They debuted in 2004 with their album No Podrás. Their album Qué Bendición reached number one on the Billboard Latin albums chart in the United States.

Members 
 Alan Ramírez, Vocalist
 Oswaldo Silvas (Walo), Vocalist
 Jairo Osuna, Clarinet
 Pavel Ocampo, Clarinet
 Elías Nordahl Piña, Trumpet
 David Castro Lejarza, Trumpet
 Ricardo Nordahl Piña, Trumpet
 Nicolás Tiznado, Tenor horn
 José Osuna, Tenor horn
 Francisco Hernández, Trombone
 José Viera, Trombone
 José Rojas, Trombone
 Roberto Frausto, Tuba
 Christian Osuna, Drum
 Luis Fernando Osuna, Snare drum
 Armando Ramirez
 Jerson Leos, Piano

History 
Julión Álvarez served as a vocalist for Banda MS from 2003 to 2007, after which point he left the band to become a solo artist. On 12 February 2016 the band received an award from Monitor Latino for their song "Solo Con Verte", which was a number one song for twelve consecutive weeks on the chart. They received this award at the Verizon Theatre at Grand Prairie, which also marked their first concert in their United States Tour.

In July 2016 Banda MS's lead singer Alan Ramirez was shot in the neck in Mexico City while traveling to see his wife at a local hotel. During a press conference band member Oswaldo Silva stated that they did not believe that the shooter was intending to murder Ramirez, nor did they believe that the shooting was drug related, further stating that they did not have any ties with drug trafficking. Ramirez was not critically injured.

Discography 
 2004: No podrás
 2005: Mi mayor anhelo
 2006: La Raza Contenta 
 2008: Escuela de rancho
 2009: En preparación
 2011: Amor enfermo
 2012: Mi razón de ser
 2013: 10 aniversario
 2014: No me pidas perdón
 2015: En vivo Guadalajara-Monterrey
 2016: Que bendición
 2017: La mejor versión de mí
 2018: Con todas las fuerzas
 2019: Lo Más Escuchado De
 2020: El Trabajo Es la Suerte
 2021: Positivo (Edición Apple Music) [Versión Acústica]
 2022: Punto y Aparte

Awards

References

External links 
 
[ Banda Sinaloense MS de Sergio Lizárraga] at Billboard.com

Mexican music
Mexican musical groups
Banda music groups
Musical groups established in 2003
Musical groups from Sinaloa